St. Johns High School is a high school in St. Johns, Arizona. It is the only high school under the jurisdiction of the St. Johns Unified School District, which also includes Coronado Elementary School and a middle school.
The school moved to its current campus in 1981. The old campus is now county offices.
Their mascot is the Redskin. This rural high school has the longest high school rivalry in Arizona state history with the neighboring high school, Round Valley Elks. This rivalry dates back to 1904.

See also

 Native American mascot controversy
 Sports teams named Redskins

References

External links
St. Johns High School

Public high schools in Arizona
Schools in Apache County, Arizona
1981 establishments in Arizona